Ma tu di che segno sei? is a 2014 Italian comedy film directed by Neri Parenti.

Cast
Massimo Boldi as Carlo Rabagliati
Gigi Proietti as Giuliano De Marchis
Vincenzo Salemme as Augusto Fioretti
Ricky Memphis as Saturno Bolla
Pio D'Antini as Piero Lo Muscio
Amedeo Grieco as Andrea Tricarico
Vanessa Hessler as Nina Rocchi
Angelo Pintus as Bruno Quagliarullo
Mariana Rodríguez as Monica Veloso
Denise Tantucci as Ilaria Fioretti
Paolo Fox as himself

References

External links

2014 films
Films directed by Neri Parenti
Films scored by Bruno Zambrini
2010s Italian-language films
2014 comedy films
Italian comedy films